Thomas Rees (1844–1921) was a contractor and politician in Queensland, Australia. He was Mayor of Brisbane in 1904.

Early life
Thomas Rees was born on 9 September 1844 in Lydstep, South Pembrokeshire, Wales, the son of Evan Rees and his wife Elizabeth (née Thomas).

Career

Thomas Rees built the now heritage-listed St Pauls Presbyterian Church in Spring Hill from 1887 to 1889. 
In 1892 he built the now heritage-listed Roman Catholic St Stephens School in Charlotte Street.
He built the now heritage-listed South East Queensland Water Board Building (R Martin & Co Building) at 41 Edward Street, Brisbane City from 1885 to 1886.
He built the now heritage-listed Spencers Building at 45-51 Edward Street, Brisbane City from 1889 to 1890.
In 1905 he built the now heritage-listed Woolloongabba Post Office(former) at 765 Stanley Street, Woolloongabba.

Later life
Thomas Rees died on 31 August 1921 at his home Lydstep in Coorparoo. He was buried the same day in Balmoral Cemetery.

See also
 List of mayors and lord mayors of Brisbane

References

Mayors and Lord Mayors of Brisbane
1921 deaths
Burials in Balmoral Cemetery, Brisbane
1844 births